Urocolius  is a small genus of mousebirds.

Species
It consists of two species which inhabit Eastern and Southern Africa:

Description
They are typically about 32 cm (13 in) long omnivorous birds, eating insects, small millipedes and plant material. Urocolius indicus in particular eats a great deal of fruit, leaves, buds, flowers, nectar and similar material.

"Urocolius" archiaci, "U." consobrinus and "U." paludicola are 3 taxa described from fragmentary Early Miocene remains found at Saint-Gérand-le-Puy in France. Their taxonomic history is convoluted, being initially described as woodpeckers and variously merged and split. Today it is believed that at least 2 belong to the prehistoric genus Limnatornis. They sometimes are all united under the first of the 3 names although it is not clear with what justification. The same rationales presumably apply for undescribed but similar remains found in Late Miocene strata at Kohfidisch (Austria).

References

External links

 
Bird genera
Taxa named by Charles Lucien Bonaparte